Wilson Warlick (March 8, 1892 – January 30, 1978) was a United States district judge of the United States District Court for the Western District of North Carolina.

Education and career

Born in Newton, North Carolina, Warlick received a Bachelor of Science degree from Catawba College in 1911 and a Bachelor of Laws from the University of North Carolina School of Law in 1913. He was in private practice of law in Newton from 1913 to 1930. He was a Judge of the Superior Court for the 16th Judicial District of North Carolina from 1931 to 1949.

Federal judicial service

Warlick was nominated by President Harry S. Truman on January 13, 1949, to a seat on the United States District Court for the Western District of North Carolina vacated by Judge David Ezekiel Henderson. He was confirmed by the United States Senate on January 31, 1949, and received his commission on February 2, 1949. He served as Chief Judge from 1961 to 1962 and from 1966 to 1968. Warlick assumed senior status on June 24, 1968 and served in that status until his death on January 30, 1978.

References

Sources
 

1892 births
1978 deaths
Catawba College alumni
University of North Carolina School of Law alumni
Judges of the United States District Court for the Western District of North Carolina
United States district court judges appointed by Harry S. Truman
20th-century American judges
North Carolina state court judges
People from Newton, North Carolina